Hamma is a town and commune in Sétif Province in north-eastern Algeria.

References

Communes of Sétif Province
Sétif Province